Blue Shield may refer to:

 Blue Shield emblem, a distinctive symbol marking cultural property defined by the 1954 Hague Convention
 Blue Shield International, an international organization named after the Blue Shield emblem that protects cultural property in emergencies
 Blue Cross and Blue Shield Association, an American health insurance group
 Blue Shield of California, health plan based in San Francisco, California
 Blue Shield (comics), a Marvel Comics Superhero
 Blue Code of Silence, an informal code of silence among police officers in the US

See also
Blue Shield of California Building